Miguel Zabalza de la Fuente (4 June 1896 – 23 September 1925) was a Spanish fencer. He competed in the individual and team épée events at the 1924 Summer Olympics. He was killed in action fighting in the Rif War.

References

External links
 

1896 births
1925 deaths
Spanish male épée fencers
Olympic fencers of Spain
Fencers at the 1924 Summer Olympics
People of the Rif War
Spanish military personnel killed in action
Olympians killed in warfare